Leigh-Anne Thompson (born January 8, 1964) is a retired American professional tennis player.

Career
Thompson turned professional in February 1982. She had career wins over Andrea Jaeger, Helena Suková, Bettina Bunge, and Catarina Lindqvist. She won 1 singles title and reached a career-high ranking of World No. 27 in 1983. She retired in 1988.

WTA Tour finals

Singles: 3 (1–2)

Grand Slam singles tournament timeline

References

External links
 
 

1964 births
Living people
American female tennis players
Sportspeople from Newport News, Virginia
Tennis people from Virginia
21st-century American women